Lobert is a surname. Notable people with the surname include:

Annie Lobert (born 1967), American call girl
Frank Lobert (1883–1932), American baseball player
Hans Lobert (1881–1968), American baseball player, coach, and scout
Jonathan Lobert (born 1985), French sailor

See also
Hobert